Monica L. Wofford, CSP, is an American business executive serving as the CEO of United Way of Lake & Sumter Counties and Contagious Companies.

Before founding the training and consulting firm, Contagious Companies, in 2003, Wofford began her speaking and training career in 1989 with her first keynote to 9000 fellow students. She has worked with leadership teams in companies such as the US Mint, the Transportation and Safety Administration, the FAA, SHRM, Hallmark, Combined Insurance, AT&T, Estee Lauder, the Non-Profit Times, Cabela's, Microsoft, and SeaWorld. She has spoken or trained in all 50 states and 27 countries for events and organizations including TED Talks, the Association of Corporate Contributions Professionals, and the Association of Legal Administrators.

Her expertise is often requested by the media and magazines such as Fortune, Forbes, CNBC, the Toronto Sun, Miami Herald, Entrepreneur magazine, CNN Headline News, Bloomberg Businessweek and U.S. News.

She is the author of six books,  including Make Difficult People Disappear: How to Deal with Stressful Behavior and Eliminate Conflict and Contagious Leadership.

She is a board member and national treasurer of the National Speakers Association.

On 1 September 2017, Wofford filed to run for the Florida House of Representatives in District 32, which includes most of Lake County. She qualified for the ballot by petition in March 2018.

References

External links
 Monica Wofford, CSP Official site
 Contagious Companies
 "When Did We All Become Difficult People?" TEDxOcala

American businesspeople
Living people
Year of birth missing (living people)